Mountmellick or Mountmellic is a town in the north of County Laois, Ireland. It lies on the N80 national secondary road and the R422 and R423 regional roads.

Name
Mountmellick, sometimes spelt Montmellick or Montmellic, is an anglicisation of the Irish name Móinteach Mílic, which means "(the) bog of/by (the) land bordering a river".  Older anglicisations include Mointaghmeelick, Montaghmelick, Montiaghmeelick and Monteaghmilick.

Coat of Arms
The motto translates as "friendship through partnership." The fretted design represents Mountmellick Work, an embroidery craft unique to the town. The diagonally-running wave represents the Owenass river, which embraces much of the town. The crosses reflect the foundation of the town by the Society of Friends or Quakers. These heraldic elements are 'crosses moline', and derive from the mill-rind, the iron centre of a millstone. They reflect an important Mountmellick industry. The sprigs of andromeda portifolia, or bog rosemary, remind us of the name place, Mointech Milic. Mointeach means "mooreland," reclaimed bogland, and Milic means wetland.

The chief herald of Ireland assigned a coat of arms to Mountmellick Town Commission on 16 December 1998.

History

Mountmellick was a 15th-century settlement on the narrow Owenass River ('River of the Falls' in Irish) with an encampment on its banks at Irishtown. Overlooking this valley with its trees and wildlife was a small church called Kilmongan (Ivy Chapel) which was closed by the Penal Laws in 1640.

English Quakers settled in the area from about 1657, led by William Edmundson. They saw a future for this settlement and built it into a town, which was to grow to 8,000 people, with 27 industries which included breweries, a distillery, woollen mills, cotton, tanneries and glass. It was a boomtown in the late 19th century. One of its earliest Quaker settlers (circa 1680) was Richard Jackson, who, with his brother Anthony, had been converted to Quakerism in Eccleston, by the missionaries George Fox and Edmundson. Jackson's older brother Anthony settled at Oldcastle in County Meath at about the same time that Jackson and his wife, Margaret Keete, came to Mountmellick. Nicholas Jackson, who may have been a son of Richard Jackson, and had been born in Lancashire, married an Anne Mann in Mountmellick in about 1702.  Descendants of Nicholas and Anne Jackson emigrated to New Garden Township, Chester County, Pennsylvania in the 1710s.  Isaac Jackson, Nicholas's uncle, also settled near New Garden Township, in 1725, in an area the family later called Harmony Grove. There is still a Quaker population in the town, and a Friends meeting house. The town has numerous examples of Georgian architecture and one of the finest examples of a Georgian square in Ireland.

The Manchester of Ireland

Such was the level of industrial activity in Mountmellick in the late 18th century that Mountmellick became known as "The Manchester of Ireland". Its role as a leading textile producer during the industrial revolution of the mid-1700s brought favourable comparisons to Manchester, the industrial centre of England at the time.

Deciduous woodlands, which once covered Laois, provided a ready source of bark for a tanning industry, which converted animal hides into leather. William Edmundson (1627–1712), the first Quaker to settle in Mountmellick, owned a tannery, and the Goodbodys and Pim families also owned tanneries in the 19th century. Towards the end of the 18th Century, the textile industry grew significantly. A number of large mills were opened in the 1780s. These produced the necessary raw materials to develop weaving as an important cottage industry, providing many households with a secondary source of income to supplement agricultural incomes. By 1837 it was estimated that 4,000 people were employed in the cotton and woollen industry in the Mountmellick area.

The three main centres of this industry were established at New Mills in Drinagh, Barkmills, near Ballyfin and Anngrove in Irishtown. Initially these mills were powered by water, but steam engines were gradually introduced during the 19th Century.

In 1801, there were five breweries in Mountmellick and these supplied beer to towns within a 25-mile radius. These breweries declined as larger breweries elsewhere developed their distribution on the railways and canals. As the temperance movement grew in the second half of the 19th Century, there was a shift from brewing to malting. Two malting enterprises in Irishtown were developed by the Codd family in the early 20th century and malt production still takes place in Mountmellick today.

The first bank in the town was opened 1824 and the first modern sugar factory in Ireland was opened in Mountmellick in 1852. It was situated behind the present MDA building in Irishtown. Despite its huge aspirations, economic factors led to its closure in 1862.

The Great Famine

The population of the town declined by 35% from 4,800 to 3,120 between 1845 and 1850. A further 3,000 people lived in close proximity to the town in 1841, many of whom were also affected. Up to this time, Mountmellick had been an extensive manufacturing town, but as the famine took grip, employment plummeted and money became very scarce. Food prices increased by 300%. People caught in a poverty trap became hungry and destitute. Diseases such as typhus and cholera appeared and more people in Mountmellick died from a fever epidemic at the time than from the famine itself.

Aid relief was sent from various parts of the world to help the starving Irish. The Quakers were among the most active in famine relief initiatives and they opened soup kitchens throughout the country. The Poor Law Union built a workhouse in Mountmellick in 1839. The workhouse was situated on the site where St. Vincent's Hospital now stands. It was built to feed and accommodate 800 paupers, but at the height of famine in 1847 (known as "Black '47") there were 1,500 people there. To deter people, the workhouses were designed to be as unattractive as possible. Husbands, wives and children were separated on entry and often never saw each other again.

Mass burial sites were dug to bury the victims. A cart of famine victims was brought daily from the workhouse to pit graves in the townland of Derryguile, one mile outside Mountmellick. A field, now known as "Reilig" (the Irish language word for grave) in the townland of Graigue is also known to have been a famine burial site.

Famous families who left during this time, or earlier, during the late 17th century, included the Newlins (who went to Chester County, Pennsylvania), Pims, Bewleys, and Dennys. Many of the earlier Quakers emigrated from Mountmellick to Pennsylvania.

Mountmellick lace
According to tradition, in 1825 a Quaker named Joanna Carter introduced what later became known as Mountmellick embroidery. The first known sale of this type of lacework was to the Earl of Dunraven (Lord Adare) of Limerick in 1847.

Although Carter is credited with its introduction little is known about her. It has been traditionally assumed that she had been a Quaker. However, an educational report of 1824 describes her as a Protestant, which may have meant that she belonged to the Church of Ireland. She ran a small school in a thatched house and had 15 girls, eight of whom were members of the Church of Ireland and seven Catholics. Her annual income was £9 per year. Although the precise location of her home is not known, we know from the 'Primary Valuation of Tenements' that a John Carter lived in a house in Pond Street, Mountmellick in 1850. This is the only recorded Carter for the town at this period. In the report on the Irish Industrial Exhibition of 1853, she was referred to as, 'Carter, J Mountmellick, Queen's County, Designer and Manufacturer, embroidered quilt, toilet cover and doileys.' The report also stated that Mrs Carter was responsible for the design and execution of a richly embroidered quilt exhibited by the Countess of Eglinton. It is not clear that she was a native of Mountmellick. Another woman associated with its early development was Margaret Beale (1809–1877), an accomplished lacemaker, originally from Enniscorthy, Co. Wexford. She was married to Joseph Beale, a prominent manufacturer in the town.

Mountmellick was a significant industrial town before the Famine of the mid-19th century, when it was known as 'The Manchester of Ireland' or 'little Manchester'. This was partly thanks to the Grand Canal, the Mountmellick branch of which is now filled in. Mountmellick embroidery, also known as Mountmellick Lace, became one of the most popular forms of needlework during the 19th century, and early examples fetch high prices on the international market. The local museum displays original pieces of this craftwork.

The history of needlework in Mountmellick before the 19th century is unclear. However, when the Society of Friends opened its school in Mountmellick in 1786, the girls were instructed in needlework to earn money for their textbooks. There appear to have been strong links between Mountmellick embroidery and the Quaker Leinster Provincial School in the town. They fostered the tradition of embroidery by both teaching it and adapting their own designs. A government school report of 1858 recorded that plain and fancy needlework was being taught at the school. The same report also noted that plain and fancy needlework was taught to girls at the Church of Ireland School Mountmellick. The Presentation order was heavily involved in the promotion of the craft. In 1920 when the Quaker school closed, the Presentation Sisters moved into the school and continued its embroidery tradition.

Four possible sources of influence on the origins on Mountmellick embroidery have been suggested. The most likely influence was crewel embroidery, because of the similarity of the stitches. (Crewel is fine worsted yarn used for embroidery and tapestry.) She may have found inspiration for her many varied designs from the abundance of flora nestled in the hedgerows and riverbanks of the Owenass River. A less likely source was that the craft originated in France and was taken to Ireland by the Huguenots. Some Huguenots did in fact settle in the nearby town of Portarlington. The third theory is that Joanna Carter may have been connected with or influenced by a Sister Carter from Fulneck, England, who started teaching embroidery at a Moravian settlement in Co. Antrim in 1793. It is unlikely that the two were related. Finally the presence of the cotton industry in the town must have been an influence on its development.

In about 1880, a Mrs Milner started an industrial association in Mountmellick to provide a livelihood 'for distressed Irish gentlewomen'. By 1890, it is known to have had 50 women employed in producing the embroidery. This seems to have led to an upsurge in interest in it. It was taken up by women throughout the country; as a consequence, it ceased to be just a local craft. A Mrs Florance Patterson, an architect from Craigivad, Co. Down, was an expert in needlework, including Mountmellick embroidery. At this time it seems that Mountmellick embroidery was gaining international recognition. For example, in 1885, Alexandra, Princess of Wales, visited Ireland and the industrial association presented her with a dressing-table cover in Mountmellick embroidery. Between 1890 and 1898, Weldon, a London publisher, produced four volumes called 'Weldon's Practical Mountmellick embroidery'. Altogether, Weldon published eight volumes on the subject and helped to make the embroidery extremely popular. Barour's Prize Needle-Work series, published in the 1890s Boston, USA, included a section on Mountmellick embroidery. One consequence of its increased popularity was that the emphasis changed from its being a source of income for the poor to being a middle-class social pastime.

The production of Mountmellick embroidery and other forms of needlework began to decline during the 19th century. By 1907, the number of people employed in the production of the embroidery had fallen from 50 to eight. Despite this, it maintained an international reputation for quality, style and durability. In 1963, US President John F. Kennedy was presented with a white Mountmellick embroidery quilt by the National Council for the Blind of Ireland.

The tradition of Mountmellick embroidery lives on today due to the work of Sr Teresa Margaret, who taught herself the traditional techniques, and until recently held weekly classes in the Mountmellick Development Association building.

Christmas tree 
The town is known for its artificial Christmas tree, locally claimed to be the biggest year-round Christmas tree in Europe and the second biggest in the world – although it is, in fact, a metal structure and not a real tree. The lighting of the tree has in the past garnered coverage on RTÉ.

Mountmellick has had a Christmas tree located in O'Connell Square since 1956. An indication of the size of the first Christmas tree can be judged by the fact that it was transported by ass and cart into O'Connell Square. In the ensuing years larger trees were erected until 1961, when it was necessary to put a manhole in the square to take these larger trees. In 1969 a pole structure was used instead of the original live tree.

In 1983 a permanent steel structure was put in place with a skeleton framework, which enabled the wiring to be standardised, and it is this structure that is in use to the present day. It is necessary every year to dress the tree with branches to give an authentic look. A switching arrangement was later introduced for the lights, which became more intricate over the years. In 1963 the switching arrangements were finalised and are the same today, other than changed designs introduced in 1968.

Education
Mountmellick has four primary schools: St Joseph's Girls' National School and St Patrick's Boys' National School, built in 1973, which share a building; St Paul's National School on the Portlaoise Road, and The Rock National School, St Patrick's Boys School one mile out on the Dublin road. There is also a Community School in the town square, serving secondary-age pupils. Until its closure in the early 21st century, the nearby Patrician College secondary school in Ballyfin, had a portion of its pupils travel from Mountmellick by bus each day.

Economic activity
The town's main industries are agriculture, light manufacturing and brewing. It serves as a dormitory town for nearby Portlaoise and for Dublin, with easy access to the M7 motorway and the Dublin-Cork railway line. This has led to the population of Mountmellick expanding rapidly in the years between 2004 and 2012 and also to an increase in new houses and several new housing estates during the Celtic Tiger era and beyond until the Irish financial crisis.

Sport
Mountmellick is a town rich in sporting activity. Mountmellick GAA is the town's club for Gaelic football and hurling, while other nearby Gaelic games clubs are The Rock GAA and Kilcavan.

Transport

Bus
Mountmellick is served by Bus Éireann as part of its route between Athlone and Waterford, with three daily services in each direction. It is also on the local Townlink route, with daily connections to Portlaoise and Tullamore.

Rail
Mountmellick railway station opened on 2 March 1885, at the end of a short branch from Portlaoise. It closed to passengers on 27 January 1947, but the branch remained open for sugar beet and special trains until 1 January 1963. The station building is now a private residence.

Canal
The Mountmellick branch of the Grand Canal became operational in March 1831 and closed in 1960.

Notable people

 Oliver J. Flanagan, and his son Charles Flanagan, politicians.
 Anne Jellicoe - Founder of Alexandra College, born in Mountmellick in 1823.
 Michael Mills – Political Editor of The Irish Press and Ombudsman of Ireland, grew up in Mountmellick.
 James Jeffrey Roche – 19th century Irish-American poet and diplomat, born in Mountmellick.
 James Sheane - Architect and designer of St. Cronan's Church, Roscrea (Church of Ireland), lived in the Manor House, Mountmellick.

See also
 List of towns and villages in Ireland

Further reading

Notes 
1.The house that Isaac Jackson's grandson built in Pennsylvania still stands there, and is a Pennsylvania Historical site, as it was used as a way-station on the Underground Railroad during the civil war by Jackson descendants.  Isaac sired a long line of Quaker families down to William Miller Jones (b. Philadelphia, 1852) who converted to Catholicism and hyphenated his middle and last names as Miller-Jones.  To this day his heirs continue to use the Miller-Jones surname.

External links

 Mountmellick Development Association web site
 Prominent Quaker Families of Mountmellick
 Mountmellick Community School website

References

Towns and villages in County Laois
Townlands of County Laois
Planned communities in the Republic of Ireland